Dawson Lea Kilgore (October 23, 1823 – April 2, 1893) was an American politician. He was a Democratic member of the Arkansas House of Representatives.

References

1893 deaths
Speakers of the Arkansas House of Representatives
Democratic Party members of the Arkansas House of Representatives
1823 births
People from Columbia County, Arkansas
19th-century American physicians
People from Robertson County, Tennessee
19th-century American politicians